Pseudomuscari is a genus of bulbous perennials  in the family Asparagaceae, subfamily Scilloideae. They were formerly included in the genus Muscari (as the Pseudomuscari group, section or subgenus). Species of Pseudomuscari have flowers in shades of pale or bright blue, and are small plants with dense flower spikes or racemes. A feature which distinguishes them from Muscari is the bell-shaped flower which is not constricted at the mouth. One species, P. azureum, is popularly grown in gardens as an ornamental Spring-flowering plant.

Systematics

The genus was formerly included in Muscari. The group of species now placed in Pseudomuscari was separated off as a section within Muscari by A.S. Losina-Losinskaja in a 1935 publication and as a subgenus by D.C. Stuart in 1965, but neither name was validly published, and the genus was first formally named by Fabio Garbari and Werner Greuter in  1970.

Species

, the World Checklist of Selected Plant Families accepts 7 species:

References

Scilloideae
Asparagaceae genera